The 2009 Ball Hockey World Championship was the eighth ball hockey world championship held by ISBHF in Plzen, Czech Republic.
Czech Republic won their second title.

Group stage

Division A

Group A

Group B

Division B

Group C

Group D

Play Off

Eighth-finals

Quarter-finals

Semi-finals

Third place match

Final

External links
 Official Website
 Sports123

Ball Hockey World Championship
Ball Hockey World Championship
Sport in Plzeň